The association football champions of Finland are the winners of the highest league in Finnish football, which is currently the Veikkausliiga . It has been played since 1990. The first 21 championship titles were decided with cup competition. From 1930 to 1989 the highest division was known as Mestaruussarja. Veikkausliiga seasons 1990 and 1991 were played under the name "Futisliiga".

Champions

Cup Competition 1908–1929

Mestaruussarja 1930–1989

Veikkausliiga 1990–present

Performance

Performance by club
The following clubs have won:

Finnish Championship Cup Competition (1908–1929) 
Mestaruussarja (1930–1989) 
Veikkausliiga (1990–present)

29 clubs have been Champions.

References
Finland - List of League First Level Tables, RSSSF

Champions
Finland
Champions